Leoliner may refer to:

 Leo Liner, the official nickname of Seibu Yamaguchi Line, a people mover in Japan
 , a tramcar made for Leipziger Verkehrsbetriebe in Germany, also used in Halberstadt